Brian Gregan (born 31 December 1989) is an Irish sprinter, born in Dublin.

Achievements

References

1989 births
Living people
Irish male sprinters
World Athletics Championships athletes for Ireland
Competitors at the 2011 Summer Universiade
Competitors at the 2013 Summer Universiade
People educated at St Mark's Community School